In mathematics, the Riemann sphere, named after Bernhard Riemann, is a model of the extended complex plane: the complex plane plus one point at infinity. This extended plane represents the extended complex numbers, that is, the complex numbers plus a value  for infinity. With the Riemann model, the point  is near to very large numbers, just as the point  is near to very small numbers.

The extended complex numbers are useful in complex analysis because they allow for division by zero in some circumstances, in a way that makes expressions such as  well-behaved.  For example, any rational function on the complex plane can be extended to a holomorphic function on the Riemann sphere, with the poles of the rational function mapping to infinity.  More generally, any meromorphic function can be thought of as a holomorphic function whose codomain is the Riemann sphere.

In geometry, the Riemann sphere is the prototypical example of a Riemann surface, and is one of the simplest complex manifolds. As with any compact Riemann surface, the sphere may also be viewed as a projective algebraic curve, making it a fundamental example in algebraic geometry. It also finds utility in other disciplines that depend on analysis and geometry, such as the Bloch sphere of quantum mechanics and in other branches of physics.

The extended complex plane is also called the closed complex plane.

Extended complex numbers

The notation  has also seen use, but as this notation is also used for the punctured plane , it can lead to ambiguity.

Geometrically, the set of extended complex numbers is referred to as the Riemann sphere (or extended complex plane).

Arithmetic operations

for any complex number , and multiplication may be defined by

Unlike the complex numbers, the extended complex numbers do not form a field, since  does not have an additive nor multiplicative inverse.

Rational functions

The set of complex rational functions—whose mathematical symbol is —form all possible holomorphic functions from the Riemann sphere to itself, when it is viewed as a Riemann surface, except for the constant function taking the value  everywhere.  The functions of  form an algebraic field, known as the field of rational functions on the sphere.

For example, given the function

Using these definitions,  becomes a continuous function from the Riemann sphere to itself.

As a complex manifold
As a one-dimensional complex manifold, the Riemann sphere can be described by two charts, both with domain equal to the complex number plane . Identify each nonzero complex number  of the first  with the nonzero complex number  of the second . Then the map

is called the transition map between the two copies of —the so-called charts—glueing them together. Since the transition maps are holomorphic, they define a complex manifold, called the Riemann sphere. As a complex manifold of 1 complex dimension (i.e. 2 real dimensions), this is also called a Riemann surface.

Intuitively, the transition maps indicate how to glue two planes together to form the Riemann sphere. The planes are glued in an "inside-out" manner, so that they overlap almost everywhere, with each plane contributing just one point (its origin) missing from the other plane.

Topologically, the resulting space is the one-point compactification of a plane into the sphere. However, the Riemann sphere is not merely a topological sphere.

On the other hand, the uniformization theorem, a central result in the classification of Riemann surfaces, states that every simply-connected Riemann surface is biholomorphic to the complex plane, the hyperbolic plane, or the Riemann sphere. Of these, the Riemann sphere is the only one that is a closed surface (a compact surface without boundary). Hence the two-dimensional sphere admits a unique complex structure turning it into a one-dimensional complex manifold.

As the complex projective line
The Riemann sphere can also be defined as the complex projective line.

In this case, the equivalence class is written  using projective coordinates. Then by the equivalence relation, which is in a chart for the Riemann sphere manifold.

This treatment of the Riemann sphere connects most readily to projective geometry. For example, any line (or smooth conic) in the complex projective plane is biholomorphic to the complex projective line. It is also convenient for studying the sphere's automorphisms, later in this article.

As a sphere

The Riemann sphere can be visualized as the unit sphere  in the three-dimensional real space . In Cartesian coordinates  and spherical coordinates  on the sphere (with  the zenith and  the azimuth), the projection is

In order to cover the unit sphere, one needs the two stereographic projections: the first will cover the whole sphere except the point  and the second except the point . Note that the two complex planes are identified differently with the plane . An orientation-reversal is necessary to maintain consistent orientation on the sphere, and in particular complex conjugation causes the transition maps to be holomorphic.

The transition maps between -coordinates and -coordinates are obtained by composing one projection with the inverse of the other. Thus the unit sphere is diffeomorphic to the Riemann sphere.

Under this diffeomorphism, the unit circle in the -chart, the unit circle in the -chart, and the equator of the unit sphere are all identified. The unit disk  is identified with the southern hemisphere , while the unit disk  is identified with the northern hemisphere .

Metric
A Riemann surface does not come equipped with any particular Riemannian metric. The Riemann surface's conformal structure does, however, determine a class of metrics: all those whose subordinate conformal structure is the given one. In more detail: The complex structure of the Riemann surface does uniquely determine a metric up to conformal equivalence. (Two metrics are said to be conformally equivalent if they differ by multiplication by a positive smooth function.) Conversely, any metric on an oriented surface uniquely determines a complex structure, which depends on the metric only up to conformal equivalence. Complex structures on an oriented surface are therefore in one-to-one correspondence with conformal classes of metrics on that surface.

Within a given conformal class, one can use conformal symmetry to find a representative metric with convenient properties. In particular, there is always a complete metric with constant curvature in any given conformal class.

In the case of the Riemann sphere, the Gauss–Bonnet theorem implies that a constant-curvature metric must have positive curvature . It follows that the metric must be isometric to the sphere of radius  in  via stereographic projection.

In real coordinates , the formula is

Up to a constant factor, this metric agrees with the standard Fubini–Study metric on complex projective space (of which the Riemann sphere is an example).

Up to scaling, this is the only metric on the sphere whose group of orientation-preserving isometries is 3-dimensional (and none is more than 3-dimensional); that group is called . In this sense, this is by far the most symmetric metric on the sphere.

Conversely, let  denote the sphere (as an abstract smooth or topological manifold). By the uniformization theorem there exists a unique complex structure on  up to conformal equivalence. All such metrics determine the same conformal geometry. The round metric is therefore not intrinsic to the Riemann sphere, since "roundness" is not an invariant of conformal geometry. The Riemann sphere is only a conformal manifold, not a Riemannian manifold. However, if one needs to do Riemannian geometry on the Riemann sphere, the round metric is a natural choice (with any fixed radius, though radius  is the simplest and most common choice). That is because only a round metric on the Riemann sphere has its isometry group be a 3-dimensional group.

Automorphisms

The study of any mathematical object is aided by an understanding of its group of automorphisms, meaning the maps from the object to itself that preserve the essential structure of the object. In the case of the Riemann sphere, an automorphism is an invertible conformal map (i.e. biholomorphic map) from the Riemann sphere to itself. It turns out that the only such maps are the Möbius transformations. These are functions of the form

Examples of Möbius transformations include dilations, rotations, translations, and complex inversion. In fact, any Möbius transformation can be written as a composition of these.

The Möbius transformations are homographies on the complex projective line. In projective coordinates, the transformation f can be written

Thus the Möbius transformations can be described as two-by-two complex matrices with nonzero determinant. Since they act on projective coordinates, two matrices yield the same Möbius transformation if and only if they differ by a nonzero factor. The group of Möbius transformations is the projective linear group .

If one endows the Riemann sphere with the Fubini–Study metric, then not all Möbius transformations are isometries; for example, the dilations and translations are not.

Applications
As a map to the complex numbers, it is undefined wherever  is zero. However, it induces a holomorphic map  to the complex projective line that is well-defined even where . This construction is helpful in the study of holomorphic and meromorphic functions. For example, on a compact Riemann surface there are no non-constant holomorphic maps to the complex numbers, but holomorphic maps to the complex projective line are abundant.

The Riemann sphere has many uses in physics. In quantum mechanics, points on the complex projective line are natural values for photon polarization states, spin states of massive particles of spin , and 2-state particles in general (see also Quantum bit and Bloch sphere). The Riemann sphere has been suggested as a relativistic model for the celestial sphere. In string theory, the worldsheets of strings are Riemann surfaces, and the Riemann sphere, being the simplest Riemann surface, plays a significant role. It is also important in twistor theory.

See also
Conformal geometry
Cross-ratio
Dessin d'enfant
Directed infinity
Hopf bundle
Möbius plane

Projectively extended real line

References

External links

 
Moebius Transformations Revealed, by Douglas N. Arnold and Jonathan Rogness (a video by two University of Minnesota professors explaining and illustrating Möbius transformations using stereographic projection from a sphere)

Riemann surfaces
Projective geometry
Spheres
Bernhard Riemann